Jay Roberts Jr. is an American actor, known for leading roles in films including White Phantom, Scent of Vengeance, and Aftershock.

Filmography 
 Theatrical movies
 Scent of Vengeance aka El Aroma Del Copal  (1996)
 Warlords 3000 aka Dark Vengeance  (1993)
 Aftershock (1990)
 White Phantom (1987)
 Thin Ice
 On the Edge

 TV appearances
 Homefront "Appleknocker to Wed Tomato-Hawker" (1993)
 Booker "Someone Stole Lucille" (1991)
 Murder She Wrote

References

External links
 
 
 Jay Roberts Jr. at The New York Times

American male film actors
American male television actors
Living people
Year of birth missing (living people)